The 2020 Australian federal budget was the federal budget to fund government services and operations for the 2020–21 financial year. The budget was presented to the House of Representatives by Treasurer Josh Frydenberg on 6 October 2020. It is the seventh budget to be handed down by the Liberal/National Coalition since their election to government at the 2013 federal election, and the second budget to be handed down by Frydenberg and the Morrison Government.

Due to the COVID-19 pandemic and the subsequent economic recession, the budget was submitted five months later than the traditional annual date of the second Tuesday in May.

Background

This budget comes after Australia has reported its largest budget deficit since the second world war. The COVID-19 pandemic put a strain on Australia’s economy, and emergency measures were taken to keep Australians employed.

The 2020/2021 budget, presented 5 months later than its traditional May date, will take this pandemic into account, especially for the department of Home Affairs, with a COVID-19 respond package.

Major measures

Receipts

Expenses

Expenditure

Debt and deficit
Deficit

The 2020/21 budget is expected to produce a net deficit of approximately $213 billion.

Debt

Opposition and crossbench response

Reception

See also

 Australian government debt
 Economy of Australia
 Taxation in Australia

References

External links
Official website

Australian budgets
Australian federal budget
Australian federal budget
2020 in Australian politics
October 2020 events in Australia